Pevensey Haven is a  long river in the Pevensey Levels in the Wealden district of East Sussex, England, that is a tributary to Salt Haven in the civil parish of Westham.

Course 
Pevensey Haven rises at the confluence of two smaller streams in the neighbourhood of Rickney (BN27)—Hurst Haven to the northeast, and Glynleigh Sewer to the west. Pevensey Haven flows a southerly course before turning east; after it receives the waters of Chilley Stream (east), it commences a southeasterly course into the civil parish of Pevensey. Pevensey Haven then turns south and flows underneath the Pevensey Bypass section of the A27 road via a culvert, where it receives the waters of Old Haven. When Pevensey Haven reaches Westham, it curves east to become known as Salt Haven.

Water quality 
Water quality of the river in 2019, according to the Environment Agency, a non-departmental public body sponsored by the United Kingdom's Department for Environment, Food and Rural Affairs:

References 

Rivers of East Sussex
Rivers of the Pevensey Levels